"Saranga Dariya" is an Indian Telugu-language folk song, originally sung by Telangana folk artistes. The song was sung by various artistes with slight changes in the lyrics. It is featured in the 2021 Telugu film Love Story starring Sai Pallavi. It is composed by Pawan CH., sung by Mangli and with lyrics written by Suddala Ashok Teja. The song became popular, when singer Komali Tatte sang it in the reality TV series Relare Rela in 2010. The film's lyrical version was released on 28 February 2021 through Aditya Music.

Music video 
The theatrical version of the song featured Sai Pallavi dancing with choreography by Sekhar. Suddala Ashok Teja wrote the lyrics for the theatrical version.

Reception 
The song is popular among the Telangana folk songs. The theatrical version of the song became popular due to which it is spotted in top positions in the national music charts. Singer Mangli got wider appreciation for her vocals. The lyrical song received praise for Sai Pallavi's dance, choreography and the vocals by Mangli adding a "perfect Telangana nativity to the folk number".

Controversy 
In March 2021, singer Komali Tatte, who gathered and performed the folk song "Saranga Dariya" on a television show years before the release of its theatrical version, stated that she wasn't credited in the lyrical video as promised. Director Kammula responded that Komala will be credited and compensated for the song.

References 

2021 songs
Indian folk songs
Telugu film songs
Telugu-language songs
Telangana music
Songs written for films
2010 songs